Robert Romano may refer to:

Robert Romano (ER)
Robert Romano, musician in Shock of Pleasure